Phyllonorycter myricae is a moth of the family Gracillariidae. It is native to Madeira and the Canary Islands. In 2000, it was studied in Hawaii as a potential biological control agent for Myrica faya.

The larvae feed on Myrica faya. They mine the leaves of their host plant. The mine consists of a lower-surface tentiform corridor that occupies about half of the leaf; always positioned against the midrib, but usually not reaching the leaf margin. There is one strong fold. The frass is clumped in a corner of the mine.

External links
Forest Pest Biological Control Program In Hawai'i
bladmineerders.nl

myricae
Moths of Africa
Moths described in 1976